Vienna (minor planet designation: 397 Vienna) is a typical Main belt asteroid. The Tholen spectral type is S and the SMASSII spectral type is K.

It was discovered by Auguste Charlois on 19 December 1894 in Nice.

References

External links
 
 

Background asteroids
Vienna
Vienna
S-type asteroids (Tholen)
K-type asteroids (SMASS)
18941219